Eclypso may refer to:

Eclypso (album), 1979 Tommy Flanagan recording
Hernan Arber, a member of the  Psytrance duo Mindelight